Aluminium gallium nitride (AlGaN) is a semiconductor material. It is any alloy of aluminium nitride and gallium nitride.

The bandgap of AlxGa1−xN can be tailored from 3.4eV (xAl=0) to 6.2eV (xAl=1).

AlGaN is used to manufacture light-emitting diodes operating in blue to ultraviolet region, where wavelengths down to 250 nm (far UV) were achieved, and some reports down to 222 nm. It is also used in blue semiconductor lasers.

It is also used in detectors of ultraviolet radiation, and in AlGaN/GaN High-electron-mobility transistors.

AlGaN is often used together with gallium nitride or aluminium nitride, forming heterojunctions.

AlGaN layers are commonly grown on Gallium nitride, on sapphire or (111) Si, almost always with additional GaN layers.

Safety and toxicity aspects
The toxicology of AlGaN has not been fully investigated. The AlGaN dust is an irritant to skin, eyes and lungs. The environment, health and safety aspects of aluminium gallium nitride sources (such as trimethylgallium and ammonia) and industrial hygiene monitoring studies of standard MOVPE sources have been reported recently in a review.

References

External links
Gallium nitride quantum dots and deep UV light emission. GaN in AlN

III-V semiconductors
Aluminium compounds
Gallium compounds
Nitrides
III-V compounds
Light-emitting diode materials